The Landfall 35 is a sailboat, that was designed by Robert W. Ball, the chief designer of C&C Design, and first built in 1979. The Landfall series was part of a trend within C&C Yachts to develop more cruising-oriented designs under company president George Cuthbertson's direction during the later 1970s and early 1980s.

Production
The design was built by the Canadian company, C&C Yachts, at their Rhode Island, United States plant, between 1979 and 1984, but it is now out of production.

The boat was produced for yacht charter market, but was also marketed as a couple's cruising sailboat.

Design
The Landfall 35 is a recreational keelboat, built predominantly of fiberglass, with extensive use of balsawood cores. It has a masthead sloop rig, a raked stem, a raised, near-vertical transom, a skeg-mounted spade-type rudder controlled by a wheel and a fixed fin keel. It displaces  and carries  of ballast.

The cabin top fits two teak dorade boxes for ventilation. Features include self tailing winches and a mainsheet traveller.

Accommodations
The boat was built with two interior arrangements, one with a conventional "V" berth forward and the other with a V-shaped couch and dinette table that could be converted into a berth for sleeping. The galley has two stainless steel sinks, a gimbal-mounted three-burner alcohol stove and  an oven and a large ice box. The head includes a shower.

Operational history
In a review, Accredited Marine Surveyor Kurtis Samples describes sailing the design: "It was a February day, the winds were 20-25 kts, with gusts to 30 kts, the temperature was 42° F and there were five foot swells with rolling white caps spaced at twenty foot intervals. A great day for sailing. We pointed her into the wind, engine steady at 1000 RPM and hoisted the main. Killed the engine, fell-off about 20 degrees to starboard and let the jenoa roll-on out. She took off quick and we could feel her accelerate ... Close hauled she will sail to within 50 degrees of true wind, but at 60 to 70 degrees is her best point of sail, she heeled gracefully, found her groove, maintained 7.02 kts and rode the waves with little to no pounding. With her high bow she'll split through and roil the waves aside with ease. When the gust came she dipped her teak toecap for few seconds, kissed 37-40 degrees of heel, shook-off the gust and then returned to the original 30 degrees. She did not want to round up, the weather helm was minimal and there were no surprises."

Samples concluded: "the C&C Landfall 35 was a pleasure to sail. She was easy to handle; predictable and forgiving yet had that solid feel of an Island Packet or Valiant. One thing I did observe during the close haul, was a slight side ways slip, which is directly related to the shoal keel."

See also

 List of sailing boat types

Similar sailboats
C&C 34/36
C&C 35
Cal 35
Cal 35 Cruise
Express 35
Freedom 35
Goderich 35
Hughes 36
Hughes-Columbia 36
Hunter 35 Legend
Hunter 35.5 Legend
Hunter 356
Island Packet 35
Mirage 35
Niagara 35
Pilot 35
Southern Cross 35

References

External links
Original C&C factory brochure for the Landfall 35 with Sail Plan, Accommodations Layout, and Standard Equipment List

Keelboats
1970s sailboat type designs
Sailing yachts
Sailboat type designs by Robert W. Ball
Sailboat types built by C&C Yachts